The Bitter End is a 230-person capacity nightclub, coffeehouse and folk music venue in New York City's Greenwich Village. It opened in 1961 at 147 Bleecker Street under the auspices of owner Fred Weintraub. The club changed its name to The Other End in June 1975. However, after a few years the owners changed the club's name back to the more recognizable The Bitter End. It remains open under new ownership.

History
An earlier club, The Cock and Bull, operated on the same premises with the same format, in the late 1950s. The poet and comedian Hugh Romney (who later became known as Wavy Gravy) read there.

The Bitter End was originally a coffeeshop. According to The New York Times, "The Bitter End, which opened in 1961, considers itself to be New York’s oldest rock club and built a legendary reputation after showcasing young performers like Joni Mitchell and James Taylor and comedians like Woody Allen and Billy Crystal." At the club, Bob Dylan played pool, watched performances, and occasionally performed circa 1961.

During the early 1960s, the club hosted folk music "hootenannies" every Tuesday night, featuring many performers who have since become legendary. During its heyday The Bitter End showcased a wide range of talented and legendary musicians, comedians, and theatrical performers.

In 1968 Paul Colby (1917–2014), who began his career as a song plugger for Benny Goodman’s publishing company, and went on to work for Frank Sinatra, Duke Ellington, and Guy Lombardo, became the manager and booking agent at The Bitter End, and in 1974 he purchased it. He purchased it about a decade after he began managing the club. Owner Paul Colby died in 2014. He had two partners in the club, Paul Rizzo and Ken Gorka. A tribute concert was held for Colby after his death. Kenny Gorka died in 2015. Gorka was an original member of New Jersey band The Critters.

According to Colby, James Taylor bombed when he played the club in 1969, and Neil Young also bombed at the club. In the mid 1970s, the club became known as the birthplace of Bob Dylan's Rolling Thunder Revue, which featured such names as Joni Mitchell, Roger McGuinn, Ramblin' Jack Elliot, Joan Baez, T-Bone Burnett, Ronee Blakely, Mick Ronson, and many other guest stars.

The Bitter End was granted landmark status by the city of New York in 1992. Also in 1992, the venue's landlord tried to evict the bar, with the venue saved by benefit performances by Peter, Paul, and Mary, Kris Kristofferson, George Carlin and others.

Lady Gaga performed at the bar in October 2016, after previously performing there as an unsigned act, before the release of her debut album. The performance was part of Gaga's Dive Bar Tour.

Live albums recorded
Numerous musical albums have been recorded at The Bitter End, including albums by Biff Rose ("Half-live at the Bitter End"), Peter, Paul and Mary, Randy Newman, Curtis Mayfield, Donny Hathaway, Arlo Guthrie, Pete Seeger, Tom Paxton, The Isley Brothers and Tommy James & the Shondells, The Chad Mitchell Trio, and Bill Haley & His Comets. Comedy albums recorded there include Bill Cosby's first album, Bill Cosby Is a Very Funny Fellow...Right!, and comedian Chris Rush's second album, Beaming In.

Comedians
These comedians appeared at The Bitter End early in their careers.

Woody Allen
Franklyn Ajaye
Albert Brooks
Lenny Bruce
George Carlin
Dick Cavett
Bill Cosby
Billy Crystal
Cheech & Chong
Chris Rush
David Brenner
David Steinberg
Don Imus
Elayne Boosler
Flip Wilson
Freddie Prinze
Gilbert Gottfried
Greg Proops
Harry Anderson
Henny Youngman
Hugh Romney aka Wavy Gravy
Joan Rivers
Jon Stewart
Lily Tomlin
Martin Mull
Mort Sahl
Pat Paulsen
Ray Romano
Richard Pryor
Rip Taylor
Robert Klein
Sandra Bernhard
Steve Landesberg
Steven Wright
The Flying Karamazov Brothers

Musicians

America
Andy Gibb
Ann Peebles
Arlo Guthrie
Barbra Streisand
Bert Sommer
Bette Midler
Bill Chinnock
Bill Haley
Bill Withers
Billy Joel
Billy Preston
Blues Project
Blues Traveler
Bo Diddley
Bob Dylan
Bob Neuwirth
Brewer & Shipley
Bruce Springsteen
Buffy Sainte-Marie
Bunky and Jake
Burlap to Cashmere
Carly Simon
Carole King
Chad Mitchell
Charles & Eddie
Chick Corea
Chuck Berry
Chuck Mangione
Country Joe McDonald
Curtis Mayfield
Curtis Stigers
Dan Avidan
David Bromberg
David Crosby
Dean Friedman
Dion
Disappear Fear
Don McLean
Donny Hathaway
Dory Previn
Doug Kershaw
Dr. John
Eddie Mottau
Ed McCurdy
Eric Weissberg
Elliott Murphy
Etta James
Frank Zappa & the Mothers of Invention
Frankie Valli
Fred Neil
G. Love & Special Sauce
Gavin DeGraw
George Thorogood & the Destroyers
Gil Scott-Heron
Glen Burtnik
Gordon Lightfoot
Grayson Hugh
Gunhill Road
Hall & Oates
Harry Chapin
Helen Reddy
Hugh Masekela
Glen Hughes
Ian & Sylvia
Idina Menzel
Isabela Moner
Indigo Girls
Ingrid Michaelson
Jackson Browne
Jae Jin
Jake Holmes
James Cotton
James Taylor
Janis Ian
Janis Joplin
Jann Klose
Jean-Luc Ponty
Jeffrey Gaines
Jerry Jeff Walker
Jesse Colin Young
Jim Croce
Jimi Hendrix
Jimmy James and the Blue Flames
Jimmy Webb
Joan Armatrading
Joan Baez
Joe Ely
Joe Walsh
John Denver
John Hartford
John Prine
John Sebastian
Johnny Nash
Joni Mitchell
José Feliciano
Josh White
Judy Collins
Kanye West
Kenny Rankin
Kenny Rogers and The First Edition
Kenny Vance and The Planotones
Kris Kristofferson
Labelle
Lacy J. Dalton
Lady Gaga (as Stefani Germanotta Band, then on Dive Bar Tour)
Lana Del Rey (Performed as "Lizzy Grant")
Larry Coryell
Laura Nyro
Leo Kottke
Leon Bibb
Les Paul
LiLi Roquelin
Linda Ronstadt
Lisa Kindred
Lisa Loeb
Little Feat
Livingston Taylor
Liza Minnelli
Los Lonely Boys
Lou Christie
Luke Sabis
Luther Allison
Maria Muldaur
Mark Duda
Mark Ronson
Marshall Brickman
Marshall Chapman
Marvin Gaye
Mary Wells
Maxene Andrews
Melanie
Melissa Manchester
Merry Clayton
Miles Davis
Mimi Fariña
Mitch Ryder & the Detroit Wheels
Mongo Santamaria
Morgana King
Mose Allison
Neil Diamond
Neil Young
New York Rock & Roll Ensemble
Nil Lara
Nina Simone
Nitty Gritty Dirt Band
Norah Jones
Odetta
Oscar Brand
Otis Rush
Pacifica
Patti Rothberg
Patti Smith
Paul Siebel
Paul Williams
Peaches & Herb
Pete Seeger
Peter Stewart
Peter Allen
Peter Hammill
Peter, Paul and Mary
Phil Ochs
Phil Trainer a/k/a Phil Steele
Phoebe Snow
Ramblin' Jack Elliott
Randy Newman
Richard Barone
Richie Havens
Ricky Nelson
Robert Hunter
Rod McKuen
Ronee Blakely
Rusted Root
Ryan Cassata
Sam & Dave
Sarah McLachlan
Shawn Colvin
Shawn Mullins
Simon & Garfunkel
Skyhill
Sonny Terry and Brownie McGhee
Spin Doctors
Stan Getz
Stéphane Grappelli
Stephen Bishop
Steve Forbert
Steve Goodman
Stevie Wonder
Stone Poneys
Suzanne Vega
Taj Mahal
Taylor Swift
The Big 3
The Box Tops
The Brandos
The Chambers Brothers
The Charlie Daniels Band
The Critters
The Everly Brothers
The Grateful Dead
The Happenings
The Isley Brothers
The Persuasions
The Searchers
The Serendipity Singers
The Shells
The Staple Singers
The Stone Poneys
The Tarriers
The Triplets
The Womenfolk
Tim Hardin
Tim Rose
Tom Paxton
Tom Rush
Tommy James & the Shondells
Tori Amos
Tracy Chapman
Van Morrison
Vanessa Carlton
Wendy Wall
Yvonne Elliman

See also
Cafe Wha?
Cafe Au Go Go
The Gaslight Cafe
Gerde's Folk City
Filmore East

References

External links

We All Played The Bitter End
Shane, Ken, "No End for the Bitter End," 9/06
Maler, Senya, "The Bitter End"

1961 establishments in New York City
Music venues in Manhattan
Nightclubs in Manhattan
New York City Designated Landmarks in Manhattan
Drinking establishments in Manhattan
Drinking establishments in Greenwich Village
Music venues completed in 1961
Comedy clubs in Manhattan